Oil Center is an unincorporated community in Crawford County, Illinois, United States.

References

Unincorporated communities in Crawford County, Illinois
Unincorporated communities in Illinois